Sevenoaks Rugby Football Club is an English rugby union club based in Sevenoaks, Kent. The club ground is on Plymouth Drive to the east of the town centre. The first XV team currently plays in National League 2 East, having reached the national levels of the sport for the first time in 2019. The club operates five senior teams and a full set of junior teams.

Current standings

Honours
Kent 2 champions: 1988–89
Kent 1 champions: 1994–95
Kent Cup winners: 1997
London 2 South East v South West play-off winners (2): 2004–05, 2015–16 
Kent Plate winners: 2013
London 1 South champions: 2018–19
 London & South East Premier champions: 2021–22

References

External links
Official club website

English rugby union teams
Rugby union in Kent
Sports clubs in England
Sevenoaks